The 2003–04 Deutsche Eishockey Liga season was the 10th season since the founding of the Deutsche Eishockey Liga. The Frankfurt Lions became German Champions, and the Wölfe Freiburg were relegated back to the 2. Bundesliga after a single season.

A visible change for the fans was the league corporate sponsorship by the German Yellow Pages who signed a 3-year agreement, later extended ending 2009.

Regular season
The regular season start was on September 4, 2003. The first 8 teams qualified for the playoffs, the last two are to go into playdowns, to determine which team will be relegated.

GP = Games Played; SOW = Shootout Win; SOL = Shootout Loss; GF:GA = Goals for and against
Color code:  = Direct Playoff qualification,  = Season ends,  = Playdown/Relegation

Playdowns
The two lowest placed teams Hannover Scorpions and Wölfe Freiburg played a Best-of-seven series play-down starting March 10, 2004.

OT = Overtime

The Wölfe Freiburg had to leave the DEL after only one season, returning to the 2. Bundesliga.

Playoffs

References

1
Ger
Deutsche Eishockey Liga seasons